On Earth We're Briefly Gorgeous is the debut novel by Vietnamese-American poet Ocean Vuong, published by Penguin Press on June 4, 2019. An epistolary novel, it is written in the form of a letter from a Vietnamese American son to his illiterate mother.

Plot 
The novel is written in the form of a letter by a young Vietnamese American nicknamed Little Dog, whose life mirrors that of Ocean Vuong. The letter is written to Little Dog's mother Hong, more often called or translated as Rose (hồng). The novel has a nonlinear narrative structure.

The novel also recounts the life of Little Dog's grandmother, Lan, who escapes an arranged marriage during the Vietnam War and becomes a prostitute. She marries a white American soldier and gives birth to a child, although the father of the child is another man, as Lan was four months pregnant when she met the man who would become her husband. The child is Little Dog's mother, Rose. She is barely literate, having left school at the age of five when her schoolhouse in Vietnam collapsed during an American napalm raid. She suffers from posttraumatic stress disorder as a result. Rose marries an abusive man but eventually separates from him.

Working in a nail salon, she struggles as a single parent living in Hartford, Connecticut with her son and her mother Lan. Living in America as refugees, the three can barely speak English. Little Dog, who is gay, is abused by his mother throughout his childhood. Halfway through the novel, Little Dog meets a young white man named Trevor while working on a tobacco farm one summer, and the two begin a romantic relationship. Trevor eventually becomes addicted to opioids and later overdoses and dies.

Reception 
At the review aggregator website Book Marks, which assigns individual ratings to book reviews from mainstream literary critics, the novel received a cumulative "Positive" rating based on 41 reviews: 22 "Rave" reviews, 14 "Positive" reviews, and 5 "Mixed" reviews. The novel debuted at number six on The New York Times Hardcover Fiction best-sellers list for the week ending June 8, 2019. It spent six weeks on the list.

Kirkus Reviews, in a rave review, wrote, "The result is an uncategorizable hybrid of what reads like memoir, bildungsroman, and book-length poem. More important than labels, though, is the novel's earnest and open-hearted belief in the necessity of stories and language for our survival. A raw and incandescently written foray into fiction by one of our most gifted poets." Ron Charles of The Washington Post praised the novel, calling it "permanently stunning". In his review for Time, Vietnamese-American novelist Viet Thanh Nguyen wrote, "Vuong refuses to be embarrassed. He transforms the emotional, the visceral, the individual into the political in an unforgettable–indeed, gorgeous–novel, a book that seeks to affect its readers as profoundly as Little Dog is affected". Writing for the Los Angeles Times, Steph Cha called the novel "a book of sustained beauty and lyricism, earnest and relentless, a series of high notes that trembles exquisitely almost without break." Writing in The New Yorker, Jia Tolentino sees the "structural hallmarks of Vuong's poetry—his skill with elision, juxtaposition, and sequencing" in the novel. Paul Batchelor, writing about his first collection in New Statesman, remarks on the surreal imagery of his poems.

Dwight Garner of The New York Times gave the novel a mixed review, writing, "Vuong's writing about nail salons, and the way mothers raised their children in them, is moving and rarely less than excellent. "On Earth We're Briefly Gorgeous" is, at the same time, filled with showy, affected writing, with forced catharses and swollen quasi-profundities. There are enough of these that this novel's keel can lodge in the mud."

The novel was named one of the top ten books of 2019 by The Washington Post. It was a finalist for the 2020 PEN/Faulkner Award for Fiction and was longlisted for the 2019 National Book Award for Fiction.

Film adaptation 
A film adaptation of the novel by A24 was announced on the December 21, 2020 episode of The A24 Podcast. Bing Liu, director of Oscar-nominated documentary Minding the Gap, is attached to adapt the novel to screen.

References 

2019 American novels
2019 debut novels
2019 LGBT-related literary works
Novels by Ocean Vuong
Penguin Press books
Epistolary novels
American bildungsromans
Refugees and displaced people in fiction
Novels set in Vietnam
Novels set in Connecticut
2010s LGBT novels
American LGBT novels
Novels with gay themes
Novels about substance abuse
Novels about heroin addiction
Nonlinear narrative novels